Serano Seymor (born 4 January 2002) is a Dutch professional footballer who plays as a centre-back for Eredivisie club Excelsior.

Career
Seymor was spotted by Academy head Marco van Lochem playing youth football for VFC Vlaardingen and was brought to the set up at Excelsior. He signed his a pro contract in the summer of 2022. He had made his debut on the opening weekend of the 2021-22 season as Excelsior played TOP Oss at Excelsior’s Stadion Woudestein on 6 August, 2021. 

Following Excelsior’s promotion from the Eerste Divisie at the end of the 2021-22 season, he made his Eredivisie debut on 12 August 2022 against SC Cambuur at the Cambuur Stadion in a 2-0 victory. Seymor scored his first professional league goal, netting in injury time to secure a 2-1 win for Excelsior over FC Emmen on 9 September, 2022.

References

External links
 

Living people
2002 births
Excelsior Rotterdam players
Dutch footballers
Eredivisie players
Eerste Divisie players
People from Vlaardingen
Footballers from South Holland
Dutch people of Surinamese descent